Kayla Burton (born 2 September 2002) is an Australian cricketer who plays as a wicket-keeper and right-handed batter for ACT Meteors in the Women's National Cricket League (WNCL). She made her WNCL debut during the Meteors' first match of the 2021–22 season, taking three catches and scoring two runs in a 207-run loss to New South Wales Breakers.

References

External links

2002 births
Living people
Australian women cricketers
ACT Meteors cricketers
Place of birth missing (living people)